This is a list of albums that reached number-one on the Irish Independent Albums Chart in 2016. The charts were compiled by GfK's Chart-Track on behalf of the Irish Recorded Music Association (IRMA).

Chart history

See also
List of number-one albums of 2016 (Ireland)
List of number-one singles of 2016 (Ireland)

References

External links
 at IRMA
 at Chart-Track

2016 in Irish music
Ireland Independent Albums
Independent 2016